Jorge Elenilson Sánchez Garay (born March 13, 1979 in  El Salvador) is a Salvadoran football player who currently plays as a defender for Luis Ángel Firpo in the Primera División de Fútbol de El Salvador.

Club career
Sánchez started his career with the Luis Ángel Firpo Reserve team in his hometown and had spells in the Salvadoran second division with Mar y Plata, Atlético Chaparrastique and Liberal I.R. before setting off on a lengthy career with Firpo where he has become club captain.

International career
Sánchez made his debut for El Salvador in an August 2005 friendly match against Paraguay and he has not played another international game since.

References

External links

1979 births
Living people
People from Usulután Department
Association football defenders
Salvadoran footballers
El Salvador international footballers
C.D. Luis Ángel Firpo footballers